Brumunddal Fotball is the football section of the Norwegian alliance sports club Brumunddal IL, located in Brumunddal, Hedmark. The organizational independency of the football section dates from 2003, although its parent club was founded in 1895. The men's football team currently plays in the 3. divisjon, the fourth tier of Norwegian football.

History
The team played in the Third Division, but after being relegated in 1995 it languished in the Fourth Division. Its return to the Third Division in 1998 also became short-lived. The team then had a longer stint from 2001 to 2004, when Strømmen IF was beaten in the playoffs, securing promotion to the 2005 Norwegian Second Division. The team had lost similar playoffs in 2003 and 2002. Brumunddal was instantly relegated to the Third Division again, but won the 2009 playoffs and has since played in the Second Division again.

Its most notable player was Vemund Brekke Skard, who transferred from Brumunddal to Ipswich Town in 2005. Vegard Skogheim has coached the team. Also, Eldar Hadžimehmedović plays for the team who once scored six goals in only one UEFA Cup match for Lyn.

Recent history 
{|class="wikitable"
|-bgcolor="#efefef"
! Season
! 
! Pos.
! Pl.
! W
! D
! L
! GS
! GA
! P
!Cup
!Notes
|-
|2008 
|3. divisjon
|align=right |2
|align=right|22||align=right|19||align=right|2||align=right|1
|align=right|80||align=right|23||align=right|59
||First round
|
|-
|2009 
|3. divisjon
|align=right bgcolor=#DDFFDD| 1
|align=right|22||align=right|17||align=right|3||align=right|2
|align=right|77||align=right|19||align=right|54
||First qualifying round
|Promoted to the 2. divisjon
|-
|2010 
|2. divisjon
|align=right |3
|align=right|26||align=right|14||align=right|4||align=right|8
|align=right|62||align=right|50||align=right|46
||Second round
|
|-
|2011 
|2. divisjon
|align=right |5
|align=right|24||align=right|12||align=right|2||align=right|10
|align=right|54||align=right|43||align=right|38
||First round
|
|-
|2012 
|2. divisjon
|align=right bgcolor="#FFCCCC"| 14
|align=right|26||align=right|3||align=right|7||align=right|16
|align=right|29||align=right|54||align=right|16
||First round
|Relegated to the 3. divisjon
|-
|2013
|3. divisjon
|align=right bgcolor=#DDFFDD| 1
|align=right|26||align=right|20||align=right|3||align=right|3
|align=right|112||align=right|29||align=right|63
||First round
|Promoted to the 2. divisjon
|-
|2014 
|2. divisjon
|align=right |9
|align=right|26||align=right|8||align=right|6||align=right|12
|align=right|33||align=right|38||align=right|30
||First round
|
|-
|2015 
|2. divisjon
|align=right |8
|align=right|26||align=right|10||align=right|7||align=right|9
|align=right|33||align=right|36||align=right|37
||First round
|
|-
|2016 
|2. divisjon
|align=right |4
|align=right|26||align=right|12||align=right|6||align=right|8
|align=right|32||align=right|33||align=right|42
||First round
|
|-
|2017
|2. divisjon
|align=right bgcolor="#FFCCCC"| 13
|align=right|26||align=right|6||align=right|4||align=right|16
|align=right|21||align=right|46||align=right|22
||Second round
|Relegated to the 3. divisjon
|-
|2018 
|3. divisjon
|align=right|4
|align=right|26||align=right|11||align=right|10||align=right|5
|align=right|43||align=right|32||align=right|43
||First round
|
|-
|2019 
|3. divisjon
|align=right|7
|align=right|26||align=right|11||align=right|5||align=right|10
|align=right|51||align=right|40||align=right|38
||First round
|
|-
|2020
|colspan="11"|Season cancelled
|-
|2021
|3. divisjon
|align=right |4
|align=right|13||align=right|7||align=right|3||align=right|3
|align=right|33||align=right|15||align=right|24
|First round
|
|-
|2022
|3. divisjon
|align=right |8
|align=right|26||align=right|8||align=right|6||align=right|12
|align=right|51||align=right|48||align=right|30
|Second round
|
|}
Source:

References

External links
 Official website

Football clubs in Norway
Association football clubs established in 2003
Sport in Hedmark
Ringsaker